The third season of Battle of the Blades premiered on September 18, 2011, as a part of CBC's fall line-up. Like previous seasons, this season showcases a lineup of 8 couples.

Ron MacLean and Kurt Browning return as the show's hosts, with the addition of Virgin Radio 999 DJ Maura Grierson as the "Battle Correspondent", providing viewers a look backstage during the competition.  Sandra Bezic continues as the head judge, with Jeremy Roenick as the other regular judge.  This season will continue to have one rotating guest judge every week.  The show venue for this season is MasterCard Centre in Toronto, Ontario.

Like the previous season, the September 18th-season premiere was actually a preview of the competition, entitled "Battle of the Blades: Game On". It documented the announcement of the cast, training camp and partner assignments of the eight couples, and was dedicated to deceased competitor Wade Belak.  The first competition night was broadcast live on Sunday, September 25, 2011.  Due to public demand, there was no elimination in week 1, with the first couple eliminated in week 2.

This season introduces "The Judges' Save", which can be used to save a couple from elimination should they be voted off after the Monday night Skate-Off.  However, it can only be used once during the entire season and only with the consensus of all judges.

Casting
The official cast announcement was made on the morning of August 22, 2011 on the show's website.  It was revealed that the first female hockey player competitor would be cast this season: Olympic Women's Hockey gold medalist Tessa Bonhomme.  She is partnered with Olympic Pairs Figure Skating gold medalist David Pelletier.  The announcement also revealed six of the seven remaining male NHL hockey players and the all skating professionals.  The seven female professionals this season include previous participants Marie-France Dubreuil (season 1 second runner-up), Anabelle Langlois (season 2), Violetta Afanasieva (season 2), and first-timers Elena Berezhnaya,  Tanith Belbin, Kim Navarro, and Marcy Hinzmann-Harris.  The partnering of competitors beyond Bonhomme & Pelletier were not announced at the time.

On August 30, 2011, former Calgary Flames team captain Todd Simpson confirmed on his Twitter page that he is the eighth hockey player participant of the season.

On August 31, 2011, competitor Wade Belak died less than one month before the scheduled premiere. CBC stated that Belak's death would not affect the show's premiere but did not announce at that time if Belak's spot would be replaced by another hockey player. CBC announced the season would open with a dedication to Belak, with footage of his final days training for the competition shown during the preview show, "Game On".

At the end of the programme "Game On", it was announced that Kim Navarro, originally Wade Belak's partner, would now be skating with former participant Russ Courtnall.  Courtnall participated in season 2 with Christine Hough-Sweeney and was the first couple eliminated.  Courtnall and Navarro are competing for Belak's original charity of choice, Tourette Syndrome and Neurodevelopmental Clinic at the Toronto Western Hospital.  Courtnall is the first hockey player participant to compete in more than one season.

Couples

Scoring Chart
Red numbers indicate the couples with the lowest score for each week.
Green numbers indicate the couples with the highest score for each week.
 indicates the couple eliminated that week.
 indicates the returning couple(s) that finished in the bottom two/three.
 indicates the returning couple that was saved by the judges using "The Judges' Save" after being eliminated in the Skate-Off the same night.
 indicates the winning couple.
 indicates the runner-up couple.
 indicates the third-place couple.

Skate-Off Chart

Notes
a ^ Skates in Week 8 were not scored by the judges.
b ^ Week 5 resulted in a Three-Way Skate-Off due to 0.03% separating 4th and 5th place after the combination of judges' score and viewer's voting.  The organizers decided that because of the close margin, the 4th place couple would also participate in the Skate-Off.  However, the exact placements of the Bottom 3 couples were not revealed.
c ^ Week 7 resulted in a Three-Way Skate-Off due to 0.002% separating 2nd and 3rd place after the combination of judges' score and viewer's voting.  The organizers decided that because of the close margin, the 2nd place couple would also participate in the Skate-Off.  However, the exact placements of the Bottom 3 couples were not revealed.

Average chart

Weekly themes and guest judges

Individual scores & songs

Week 1
Individual judges scores in charts below (given in parentheses) are listed in this order from left to right:  Darcy Tucker, Sandra Bezic, Jeremy Roenick.
Running order

Week 2
Individual judges scores in charts below (given in parentheses) are listed in this order from left to right:  Theoren Fleury, Sandra Bezic, Jeremy Roenick.
Running order

Week 3
Individual judges scores in charts below (given in parentheses) are listed in this order from left to right:  Mark Napier, Sandra Bezic, Paul Martini.
Running order

Week 4
Individual judges scores in charts below (given in parentheses) are listed in this order from left to right:  Bryan Trottier, Sandra Bezic, Brian Orser.
Running order

Week 5
Individual judges scores in charts below (given in parentheses) are listed in this order from left to right:  Chris Nilan, Sandra Bezic, Jeremy Roenick.
Running order

Week 6
Individual judges scores in charts below (given in parentheses) are listed in this order from left to right:  Katarina Witt, Sandra Bezic, Jeremy Roenick.
Running order

Week 7
Individual judges scores in charts below (given in parentheses) are listed in this order from left to right:  Christopher Dean, Sandra Bezic, Jeremy Roenick.
Running order

Week 8
None of the skates in Week 8 were scored.
Running order

Weekly ratings
Weekly ratings and rankings are measured by BBM Canada, an audience measurement organization for Canadian television and radio broadcasting.  Weekly ranks are based on weeks starting on Monday and ending on Sunday.

References

External links
 Official website of Battle of the Blades

Season 03
2011 Canadian television seasons